This is a list of electoral district results for the 1935 Queensland state election.

At the time, the voting system in Queensland was based on contingency voting, which was similar to the modern optional preferential voting system. In electorates with 3 or more candidates, preferences were not distributed if a candidate received more than 50% of the primary vote.

If none received more than 50%, all except the top two candidates were eliminated from the count and their preferences distributed between the two leaders, with the one receiving the most votes declared the winner.

Results by electoral district

Albert

Aubigny

Barcoo

Baroona

Bowen

By-elections 

 This by-election was caused by the death of Charles Collins. It was held on 20 June 1936.

Bremer

Brisbane 

 Preferences were not distributed.

By-election 

 This by-election was caused by the death of Robert Funnell. It was held on 4 April 1936.

Bulimba 

 Preferences were not distributed.

Bundaberg 

 Preferences were not distributed.

Buranda 

 Preferences were not distributed.

Cairns 

 Preferences were not distributed.

Carnarvon 

 Preferences were not distributed.

Carpentaria

Charters Towers 

 Preferences were not distributed.

Cook 

 Preferences were not distributed.

Cooroora

Cunningham

Dalby

East Toowoomba

Enoggera

Fassifern

Fitzroy

Fortitude Valley

Gregory

Gympie

Hamilton

Herbert 

 Preferences were not distributed.

Ipswich

Isis

Ithaca

Kelvin Grove

Kennedy

Keppel

By-election 

 This by-election was caused by the death of Owen Daniel. It was contested and won by his son, David Daniel. It was held on 4 April 1936.

Kurilpa 

 Preferences were not distributed.

Logan

Mackay 

 Preferences were not distributed.

Maranoa

Maree

Maryborough

By-election 

 This by-election was caused by the death of James Stopford. It was held on 27 February 1937.

Merthyr

Mirani

Mundingburra 

 Preferences were not distributed.

Murrumba

Nanango

Normanby

Nundah

Oxley

Port Curtis 

 Preferences were not distributed.

Rockhampton

Sandgate

South Brisbane

Stanley

The Tableland 

 Preferences were not distributed.

Toowong 

 Preferences were not distributed.

Toowoomba 

 Preferences were not distributed.

By-election 

 This by-election was caused by the resignation of Evan Llewelyn. It was held on 14 December 1935.

Townsville

Warrego

By-election 

 This by-election was caused by the resignation of Randolph Bedford who attempted to enter Federal politics. He was unsuccessful in his attempt to win the seat of Maranoa, but succeeded in retaining his old seat in the State Assembly afterward.

Warwick

West Moreton

Wide Bay

Windsor

Wynnum 

 Preferences were not distributed.

See also 

 1935 Queensland state election
 Candidates of the Queensland state election, 1935
 Members of the Queensland Legislative Assembly, 1935-1938

References 

Results of Queensland elections